Tall Bumeh (also Romanized as Tall Būmeh, Tal Būmeh, and Tall-e Būmeh; also known as Tel Būma and Zūair) is a village in Mollasani Rural District, in the Central District of Bavi County, Khuzestan Province, Iran. At the 2006 census, its population was 1,010, in 144 families.

References 

Populated places in Bavi County